The Raid of Ruthven was a political conspiracy in Scotland which took place on 22 or 23 August 1582. It was composed of several Presbyterian nobles, led by William Ruthven, 1st Earl of Gowrie, who abducted King James VI of Scotland. The nobles intended to reform the government of Scotland and limit the influence of French and pro-Catholic policy, and to prevent or manage the return of Mary, Queen of Scots from England. Their short-lived rule of around 10 months is known as the "Ruthven" or "Gowrie Regime".

Scottish coup d'état

Ruthven Castle
In July 1582 the discontented lords made a bond to support each other in their enterprise to displace Catholic influences around the young king. Their party became known as the "Lords Enterprisers", their opponents were the King's favourite, the French Esmé Stewart, 1st Duke of Lennox, and James Stewart, Earl of Arran, who shared control of the government. James VI was seized while hunting near the castle of Ruthven in Perthshire on 22 (or 23) August. Some sources including the letters of Robert Bowes, an English diplomat sent to Scotland after the event, state the King was captured at Ruthven Castle on 23 August. The Ruthven lords presented the King with a lengthy "supplication" explaining the motives of their surprise action, dated 23 August.

The 17th-century historian David Calderwood named the Ruthven Raiders as the Earls of Mar and Gowrie, the Master of Glamis, the Laird of Easter-Wemyss, Lewis Bellenden, Lord Boyd, Lord Lindsay, the Abbot of Dunfermline, David Erskine, Commendator of Dryburgh, the Abbot of Paisley, the Prior of Pittenween, and the Constable of Dundee.

It was said that James VI started to cry. The Master of Glamis is reported to have said "Better bairns greet than bearded men". "Greet" is a Scots language word for weeping.

To prevent a rescue attempt by the Duke of Lennox's soldiers, the Earl of Mar stationed an armed force at Kinross to break their march north. The Earl of Arran's brother, William Stewart reached Ruthven and fought the raiders, lost two fingers and was captured. Arran himself arrived and was captured.

The King was held and controlled by the Ruthven Lords for almost a year. He was moved around a number of houses. He was taken to Perth the next day, where the earl of Gowrie had a large townhouse, as Provost of the town. David Moysie wrote that the lords gave him their "supplication" at Perth, then he was taken to Stirling Castle at the end of August. At Stirling the Ruthven party was swelled by Francis Stewart, Earl of Bothwell, the Earl of Glencairn and Laurence, Master of Oliphant, and their retainers to the number of 400. In October 1582, James was at Holyrood Palace in Edinburgh.

Ruthven Castle's name was officially changed to Huntingtower in 1600 after the Gowrie House conspiracy. The castle is maintained and opened to the public by Historic Environment Scotland.

Sources
Copies of relevant papers, such as the Lords's "supplication" of 23 August 1582 and Lennox's protest, "D'Obany's petition", were given by John Colville to Robert Bowes and sent to England, where they remain in the Public Record Office.

Opponents of the Regime
The earl of Gowrie remained at the head of the government assisted by figures like the Master of Glamis. The king's favourite Esmé Stewart, Duke of Lennox, the main politician targeted by the coup, was sent to Dumbarton Castle, then forced into exile in France, after lingering at Rothesay Castle on the Island of Bute, and died in Paris in May 1583. Another prominent politician, the recently ennobled James Stewart, Earl of Arran, was imprisoned at Dupplin, Stirling, Ruthven (Huntingtower), then confined at his own Kinneil House.
Among the rest of the nobility, the Ruthven regime was opposed by the Earls of Huntly, Crawford, Morton (Maxwell) and Sutherland, and the Lords Livingston, Seton, Ogilvy, Ochiltree and Doune, all of whom were reported to support Arran and Lennox.

Policy

The resultant Gowrie regime favoured what has been described as an ultra-Protestant regime and was approved by the General Assembly of the Church of Scotland as the 'late act of the Scottish reformation'. The Regime was approved by influential ministers of the Kirk of Scotland from the pulpit. These churchmen were called "Melvillians" after their spokesman Andrew Melville. The noble leaders of the regime also included those who were "discomfited" by the fall of James Douglas, Regent Morton in 1581, and the Douglas family, who had been exiled in England, were re-instated on 28 September 1582.

The coup was also prompted by an urge to curb excessive spending at court. Because of its extravagance, the Earl of Gowrie as Lord High Treasurer of Scotland was owed £48,000 Pound Scots. This debt was never repaid. A number of cost-saving measures for the royal household were proposed by Gowrie and his exchequer colleagues.

Lennox seems to have made himself particularly unpopular by using his office of Chamberlain to profit from merchant trade in the Scottish towns and burghs. The Ruthven Regime ordered him to leave Scotland. Lennox was able to delay his exile unto 22 December, when he sailed for France. He never returned.

Response in England
Queen Elizabeth was pleased with events and sent £1000 in September 1582 with Robert Bowes, a payment declared as the wages of the King's Guard. In response, the opponents of the Ruthven Regime, the Earls of Huntley, Argyll, Atholl, Crawford, Montrose, Arran, Lennox and Sutherland, wrote a letter from Dunkeld (near Atholl's Blair Castle) to the town of Edinburgh describing this force, funded by England, as four hundred men-of-war raised for the purpose of conveying James VI to their "auld enemies" in England. They urged the townspeople of Edinburgh to arm themselves and seize the King, who was at Holyroodhouse, on their behalf. The people of Edinburgh did not follow up on this suggestion.

The reaction of Francis Walsingham was more circumspect. He wrote to the Earl of Shrewsbury, the keeper of Mary, Queen of Scots, with news of progress in Scotland on 26 September 1582. Walsingham thought that "thinges stand not yet in so good termes as were to be wished". He found King James' own letters, and his speech in favour of the Duke of Lennox made at Stirling on 14 September, to demonstrate 'of what rare towardliness that yonge prince is, and howe dangerous an enemye therefore he would prove unto England yf he should happen to runne to any other coorse.'

French reaction and English diplomacy
Catherine de' Medici, the French queen mother, wrote to the French ambassador in London, Michel de Castelnau, with her concerns over the capture of King James and the exile of Lennox. Elizabeth I was told that Castelnau secretly conveyed letters to Mary, Queen of Scots, and to her supporters in Scotland. Walsingham asked the ambassador in France, Henry Cobham, to advise Henry III of France and Catherine de' Medici of the situation, and that Castelnau should be more circumspect in the handling of Mary's letters. Elizabeth had no wish to foment further disquiet in Scotland following the recent disturbances.

Requests for funding
Colonel William Stewart was sent as ambassador by the regime to England in April 1583 to ask for £10,000 and yearly £5000 as an income from the English lands of Matthew Stewart, 4th Earl of Lennox, and for the ratification and renewal of the 1560 Treaty of Edinburgh. The Colonel was to enquire discreetly after the succession to the English throne. Robert Bowes, the English diplomat, stayed in Edinburgh and followed events. As it seemed opportune, he was instructed by Francis Walsingham to seek out the casket letters which had been used to incriminate Queen Mary in 1568, but the Earl of Gowrie refused to hand them over.

French embassy
Gowrie was also courted by France, receiving in February 1583 an offer of a yearly pension of 100,000 crowns for the state, 2000 crowns personally, and a lump sum of 10,000 crowns. Two French ambassadors, Bertrand de Salignac de la Mothe-Fénelon and François de Rocherolles, Sieur de Maineville, hoped to secure French influence over James's choice of bride. James VI gave the French ambassadors an audience in the presence of William Davidson, a English diplomat who would later deliver Mary, Queen of Scots death warrant. The ambassadors intended to build a pro-French faction, and may have offered French pensions to sympathetic nobles. Maineville remained in Scotland until May 1583. His presence and unpopularity divided the Ruthven lords and weakened their support.

Failure of the Gowrie Regime
Gowrie's regime was ineffectually supported by Queen Elizabeth I and her Secretary Walsingham. After ten months, the king gained his freedom at St Andrews in July 1583. James VI first stayed at the New Inns of St Andrews but was persuaded to sleep in St Andrews Castle. The faction opposed to the Gowrie regime was there in strength, and the Lords Enterprisers were dismissed from court, and a number of their followers who were salaried court servants were sacked. James VI went to Stirling and Falkland Palace, then joined Arran for a banquet at Kinneil House on 13 November, and returned to Edinburgh. The Earl of Arran gained a brief ascendancy over Scottish affairs. The earl of Gowrie was pardoned, but kept plotting and was later beheaded for high treason. In November 1585, however, Arran himself was removed from public affairs.

As Queen Elizabeth was displeased by the fall of the Ruthven Regime, Walsingham was sent as ambassador to Scotland in September 1583. He spoke to James VI at Perth, and was convinced that Queen Mary's influence was dominant in Scotland, and working to the young king's confusion. He wrote to Elizabeth that Mary, "though she cannot live many years" would see his overthrow. James VI had not enjoyed the Ruthven government. Walsingham found the King unable to take his complaints seriously, and he laughed at Walsingham, "falling into a distemperture", telling him that he was an "absolute King" and would order his subjects as he would "best lyke himself."

Arran and the Earl of Crawford hired Kate the Witch to disrupt Walsingham's visit, with £6 and a length of plaid cloth. She stood outside the royal palaces complaining about the amity with England, the kirk, and the nobility.

Last of the Oliphants
Two of those implicated in the Raid, the eldest son of the Chief of Clan Oliphant, Laurence Master of Oliphant, and his brother-in-law Robert Douglas, Master of Morton, were exiled in 1584. The ship in which they sailed to France was lost at sea, and it was rumoured that their ship had been captured by a Dutch ship and they were killed in the fighting or drowned with their ship. Later, there were reports that they had been sold to a Turkish slave ship. In 1589, a Scot, James Hudson, with the Scottish ambassador, appealed to Francis Walsingham for his help finding the men, reported to be slaves in the castle of Algiers. In 1601, Robert Oliphant went to Algiers to look for his kinsmen, carrying a letter of introduction to Sultan Mehmed III written by Queen Elizabeth, who also recommended her ambassador John Wroth help the search.

A plaque to their memory was raised in the English church in Algiers. The 17th-century historian of the Douglas family, David Hume of Godscroft laid the blame for their loss on Robert's mother, Agnes Leslie, Countess of Morton, for her attempt in 1584 to prevent them supporting the Earl of Gowrie, which was considered misguided.

See also 
 John Colville
 Robert Boyd, 5th Lord Boyd

References

 The Ruthven Raid
 History of Scottish Earls

External links
 Moysie, David, Memoirs of the Affairs of Scotland, vol.1 Bannatyne Club (1830)
 Stevenson, Joseph, ed., Correspondence of Robert Bowes, the ambassador of Queen Elizabeth in the court of Scotland, Surtees Society (1842)

16th century in Scotland
1582 in Scotland
1583 in Scotland
History of Perth and Kinross
James VI and I